The Sheltering Sky is the original soundtrack to the 1990 film The Sheltering Sky (based on a novel by Paul Bowles) starring Debra Winger and John Malkovich. The original score was composed primarily by Ryuichi Sakamoto.

The album won the Golden Globe Award for Best Original Score and the LAFCA Award for Best Music.

Track listing

LP edition
Vinyl edition has two additional tracks which are not included in CD release:
 Side B; 1. "Louange Au Prophete"  (performed by Houria Aichi. Flute: Said Missia)
 Side B; 10. "Guedra" (performed by The Awash of Ouarzazate. Composed by Lanchen Zinoun)

Personnel
 Ryuichi Sakamoto – composer, producer
 David Arch – conductor, arranger
 John Altman – conductor, arranger
 Royal Philharmonic Orchestra – orchestra
 James Cullam – keyboards, programmer, engineer
 Matt Howe – engineer
 Chris Ludwinski – engineer
 Spencer May – engineer
 Ray Staff – mastering

References

Drama film soundtracks
Ryuichi Sakamoto albums
Albums produced by Ryuichi Sakamoto
1990 soundtrack albums
Virgin Records soundtracks